The 1976 San Jose State Spartans football team represented San Jose State University during the 1976 NCAA Division I football season as a member of the Pacific Coast Athletic Association. The team was led by first year head coach Lynn Stiles. They played home games at Spartan Stadium in San Jose, California. The Spartans finished the season as champions of the PCAA for the second year in a row, with a record of seven wins and four losses (7–4, 4–0 PCAA).

Schedule

Team players in the NFL
The following were selected in the 1977 NFL Draft.

Notes

References

San Jose State
San Jose State Spartans football seasons
Big West Conference football champion seasons
San Jose State Spartans football